David Westley (born 7 June 1974) is a former professional rugby league footballer and assistant coach of the Papua New Guinea . A Papua New Guinea international front-rower, he played club football for the Canberra Raiders, with whom he won the 1994 Winfield Cup Premiership before spending time with the Parramatta Eels and the Northern Eagles.

Playing career
Westley's junior club was the Cairns Kangaroos. He was Canberra's Rookie of the Year in 1993, and was a part of the Grand Final winning side in 1994 as they defeated Canterbury-Bankstown in the decider.  As of the 2020 NRL season, this has been Canberra's last premiership victory.

The following year, Westley was selected to play for Papua New Guinea in the 1995 World Cup in England.  Westley played for Canberra until the end of the 1999 NRL season before departing the club to sign with Parramatta.  Westley played 25 games for Parramatta in his first season at the club as they reached the preliminary final against Brisbane which Parramatta lost 16–10 at Stadium Australia.  He played eight games the following year at Parramatta finished as runaway Minor Premiers.  In 2002, he signed for the Northern Eagles playing twelve games.  He then returned to Cairns to coach the senior side.

References

1974 births
Living people
Australian rugby league players
Canberra Raiders players
Parramatta Eels players
Northern Eagles players
Papua New Guinea national rugby league team players
Australian people of Papua New Guinean descent
Rugby league props